Jon Svaleson Smør (c. 1420–1483) was a Norwegian knight, riksråd and regent.

Jon was a son of the knight Svale Jonson Smør and his wife Sigrid Gunnarsdotter Kane. He was a knight from 1449, and cabinet minister from 1458. In the 1470s he was a fehird (tax minister) and høvedsmann (lord) of the king's farm. Later, he was one of main forces behind the reactivation of the Norwegian Riksråd at the end of the reign of King Christian I. As a riksråd, and from 1482 regent, he led the policy of the Riksråd to maintain Norway's political interests during the interregnum between 1481 and 1483.

Jon was probably after 1450 married to Gudrun Olavsdotter (c. 1415–1476/86), daughter of the knight Olav Håkonsson and Ingebjørg Jonsdotter. It is unknown if they ever had any children together. Jon died of drowning at Jersøy, near Tønsberg, the last man in the direct male line of the Smør family.

See also
 Smør
 Norwegian nobility

Sources
Handegård, Odd (2008), "Vår felles slektshistorie. Hardanger, Sunnhordland og Ryfylke m.m. 1170-1650", p. 109-111
Opsahl, Erik, Jon Svalesson Smør – utdypning (NBL-artikkel), Store norske leksikon

1420s births
1483 deaths
15th-century Norwegian monarchs
Norwegian knights
Deaths by drowning in Norway
Year of birth uncertain
Regents of Norway
J